The 1985 Tour de France was the 72nd edition of Tour de France, one of cycling's Grand Tours. The Tour began in Plumelec on 28 June and finished on the Champs-Élysées in Paris on 21 July. The Tour organisation invited 21 teams to the Tour, with 10 cyclists each. Three teams withdrew prior to starting. Finally 18 teams started, setting a new record of 180 riders.

Teams

Cyclists

By starting number

By team

By nationality
The 180 riders that competed in the 1985 Tour de France were represented by 16 different countries. Riders from eight countries won stages during the race; Belgium riders won the largest number of stages.

Notes

References

1985 Tour de France
1985